Jeff DiMaria is a retired American soccer midfielder who played professionally in Major League Soccer and the second Major Indoor Soccer League.

Youth
In 1995, DiMaria graduated from Christian Brothers College High School where he was a two-time All State soccer player.  He began his collegiate career at the University of Connecticut where he played two seasons (1995–1996).  In 1997, he had knee surgery early in the season and redshirted that year.  DiMaria then transferred to St. Louis University where he finished his last two seasons of college soccer.  He was a 1999 First Team All American.  In 1996, DiMaria was a member of the Scott Gallagher U-19 national championship team and in 1998, he was part of the  Scott Gallagher U-23 national championship team.  He graduated with a bachelor's degree in health information management and is a member of the Billikens Hall of Fame.

Professional
In February 2000, the Colorado Rapids selected DiMaria in the second round (twenty-sixth overall) of the 2000 MLS SuperDraft.  DiMaria played the Rapids first four games of the season, starting two.  On April 10, 2000, Colorado signed Junior Agogo and released DiMaria to open a roster spot.  DiMaria then signed with the St. Louis Steamers of the World Indoor Soccer League for the summer indoor season.  He spent two seasons with the Steamers.  The team announced they were going on hiatus in 2002 and the Cleveland Crunch selected DiMaria in the dispersal draft.  He did not play for the Crunch, but remained in St. Louis and played for the St. Louis Strikers in the Premier Developmental League.  In the fall of 2003, the Steamers entered the second Major Indoor Soccer League, but folded following the 2005-2006 season.  On September 25, 2006, the Detroit Ignition selected DiMaria in the dispersal draft.

International
DiMaria played for the United States national futsal team in 2003.

References

External links
 St. Louis Steamers: Jeff DiMaria
 

Living people
1977 births
American men's futsal players
American soccer players
Colorado Rapids players
UConn Huskies men's soccer players
Major League Soccer players
Major Indoor Soccer League (2001–2008) players
Major Indoor Soccer League (1978–1992) players
Saint Louis Billikens men's soccer players
Soccer players from Missouri
St. Louis Steamers (WISL) players
St. Louis Steamers (2003–2006 MISL) players
World Indoor Soccer League players
St. Louis Strikers players
USL League Two players
Colorado Rapids draft picks
All-American men's college soccer players
Association football midfielders